Loudest Common Denominator is a live album by American rock band Drowning Pool, and was recorded in San Diego. It was released on March 3, 2009. On February 4, 2009, Eleven Seven Music released a video on YouTube of the band revealing details of the album. These details included the album having acoustic versions of both "37 Stitches" and "Shame". On February 5, 2009, Drowning Pool announced on their official website the track listings of the album, and also revealed the cover of the album.

Track listing
All songs written by Drowning Pool

Personnel
Drowning Pool
 Ryan McCombs – Vocals
 Stevie Benton – Bass, Backup vocals
 C. J. Pierce – Guitar, Backup Vocals
 Mike Luce – Drums, Backup vocals

Production
 Produced by Drowning Pool
 Tracks 1–11 recorded live in San Diego, mixed by Tye Robison
 Track #12 recorded and mixed by Tye Robison at January Sound Studio, Dallas, TX
 Track #13 produced, engineered and mixed by D. Braxton Henry for 379 Productions
 Mastered by Dave Donnelly at DNA Mastering
 Live Photos by Nathan W. Stahly and Larry Perez
 Insert Images by Michelle Overson
 Packaging Design by Trevor Niemann at Visual Entropy
 Illustrations by Lisa Niemann at Toxic Pretty

References

Drowning Pool live albums
2009 live albums
Eleven Seven Label Group live albums